Cesena Football Club is an Italian football club based Cesena, Emilia-Romagna. Currently it plays in Italy's Serie C. It has claimed to be the phoenix club of A.C. Cesena since 2018, the year that the club folded.

History

Foundation
The club was founded in 1973,  at which time it was known as Polisportiva Martorano.

Serie D

In the 2012–13 season, the team was promoted for the first time, from Eccellenza Emilia-Romagna Group B to 2013–14 Serie D Group D, as Romagna Centro. The club was also compared to Chievo, which was a second team behind Hellas Verona, but promoted to Serie A.

R.C. Cesena

In July 2018, after the bankruptcy of the main football team of the city, A.C. Cesena, a group of local businessmen acquired Romagna Centro and proposed to rename it to Cesena F.C., to act as a phoenix club. However, the image rights of A.C. Cesena were acquired later. The club played a friendly match against Romanian club Universitatea Cluj in 2018–19 pre-season. In July 2018, Romagna Centro announced that the youth sector would train with former A.C. Cesena players. However, the club was later known as R.C. Cesena, and was assigned to Group F of 2018–19 Serie D.

After instantly winning promotion to Serie D, the club was renamed Cesena Football Club.

In the 2019–20 season the club is competing in the Serie C's Girone B.

Colours and badge
As Romagna Centro, the team's colours were lightblue and white.

The current shirt colors are black and white, so that the nickname of the club is "bianconeri"

Stadiums
The club played their home matches in Centro Sportivo Romagna Centro, located in Via Calcinaro, Martorano frazione. The club also played their Serie D home matches in Stadio Dino Manuzzi, the larger stadium in the city.

The stadium is quite famous in Italy, and has also hosted some euro 2019 u-21 matches, charity matches and some other events like concerts.

Honours
Eccellenza:
Winner (1): 2012–13

Current squad
.

Out on loan

References

External links
  

 
Football clubs in Italy
Football clubs in Emilia-Romagna
Sport in Cesena
Phoenix clubs (association football)
1973 establishments in Italy